The 1976 Critérium du Dauphiné Libéré was the 28th edition of the cycle race and was held from 24 May to 31 May 1976. The race started in Grenoble and finished in Montélimar. The race was won by Bernard Thévenet of the Peugeot team.

Teams
Nine teams, containing a total of 89 riders, participated in the race:

 
 
 
 
 Lejeune–BP

Route

General classification

References

1976
1976 in French sport
1976 Super Prestige Pernod
May 1976 sports events in Europe